Borja Sánchez Luque (born 12 April 1978) is a Spanish retired footballer who played as a left back.

Football career
Born in Lada (Langreo), Sánchez emerged through local giants Sporting de Gijón's youth system, but could only amass ten appearances for its first team, in four separate second division seasons.

Finally released in 2002, he resumed his career in the third level, representing in quick succession Orihuela CF, Burgos CF, Real Oviedo, SD Huesca and UE Lleida. In 2008, already in his 30s, Sánchez dropped down to division four – he had already played one season in the category with Oviedo, winning the championship – and returned to his native Asturias, also appearing for several clubs.

Honours
Lealtad
Tercera División: 1997–98

Oviedo
Tercera División: 2004–05

External links

1978 births
Living people
People from Langreo
Spanish footballers
Footballers from Asturias
Association football defenders
Segunda División players
Segunda División B players
Tercera División players
Sporting de Gijón B players
CD Lealtad players
Sporting de Gijón players
SD Eibar footballers
Orihuela CF players
Burgos CF footballers
Real Oviedo players
SD Huesca footballers
UE Lleida players